Elachista morandinii is a moth of the family Elachistidae that is found in Italy and Hungary.

References

morandinii
Moths described in 2003
Moths of Europe